Erode Soundar (c. 1957 – 5 December 2020) was an Indian film writer and director, who primarily worked on Tamil language films.

Career
In the 1990s, Erode Soundar regularly collaborated with director K. S. Ravikumar on village action films including Cheran Pandiyan (1991), Putham Pudhu Payanam (1991) and Nattamai (1994). The success of Cheran Pandiyan and Nattamai prompted the films to be remade in several languages including Hindi, Telugu, Kannada and Bengali. He also won the Tamil Nadu State Film Award for Best Story Writer award for both films, while also securing the Best Dialogue Writer award for Cheran Pandiyan.

Although he worked primarily as a writer, he also directed a few films including Mudhal Seethanam (1992), where he also acted in a supporting role. His close association with Sarathkumar through K. S. Ravikumar's films, also garnered him the opportunity to direct the actor in Simmarasi (1998). His final film, Ayya Ullen Ayya (2020), had a low profile release and featured his grandson Kabilesh in the lead role.

Death
Soundar died aged 63 on 5 December 2020 following a kidney-related illness.

Partial filmography

References

External links

1957 births
2020 deaths
People from Erode district
Film directors from Tamil Nadu
Tamil film directors
Indian television directors
20th-century Indian film directors
21st-century Indian film directors